Classics is a compilation album by Canadian rock band Triumph, released in 1989 (see 1989 in music).

Track listing
 "Tears in the Rain" – 3:53
 "Hold On" (Emmett) – 6:05
 "I Live for the Weekend" – 5:18
 "Magic Power" – 4:54
 "Follow Your Heart" – 3:27
 "A World of Fantasy"† (Emmett, Levine, Moore, Tim Patrick) – 5:03
 "Fight the Good Fight" – 6:20
 "Spellbound" – 5:12
 "Somebody's Out There" – 4:05
 "Lay It on the Line" (Emmett) – 4:04
 "Rock 'n' Roll Machine" (Moore) – 6:55

All of the songs were written by Rik Emmett, Mike Levine and Gil Moore except as indicated.

†Bonus track on CD and digital versions only.

Personnel
 Rik Emmett – guitars & vocals
 Gil Moore – drums & vocals
 Michael Levine – bass & keyboards

Production credits
Mike Clink – tracks 1, 9
Mike Levine and Triumph – tracks 2, 10
Triumph – tracks 3, 4, 7
Triumph and Eddie Kramer – tracks 5, 8
Triumph and David Thoener – track 6
Mike Levine and Doug Hill – track 11

Certifications

References

Triumph (band) albums
Albums produced by Eddie Kramer
Albums produced by Mike Clink
Albums produced by Mike Levine (musician)
1989 compilation albums